Semeliškės is a town in Elektrėnai municipality, Vilnius County, east Lithuania. According to the Lithuanian census of 2011, the town has a population of 580 people. The town has a church of Catholics and Orthodox church of St. Nicolas.

Its alternate names include Sameliškės, Semelishkes, Semelishkis, Semeliškių, Sumelishki, Sumilishki, Siemieliszki, and Sumiliszk.

History

On October 6, 1941, 962 Jews of the town were murdered in a mass execution perpetrated by an Einsatzgruppen of local policemen and Lithuanian collaborators.

References

External links
 The murder of the Jews of Semeliškės during World War II, at Yad Vashem website.

Towns in Vilnius County
Towns in Lithuania
Troksky Uyezd
Holocaust locations in Lithuania
Elektrėnai Municipality